Véronique Munoz-Dardé is Professor of Philosophy in the University College London Department of Philosophy and Mills Adjunct Professor of Philosophy at University of California at Berkeley. She is known for her works on ethics and political philosophy.

Books
 La justice sociale :Le libéralisme égalitaire de John Rawls, Nathan Université 2000

See also
Luc Foisneau

References

External links
Véronique Munoz-Dardé at UCL
Véronique Munoz-Dardé, Google Scholar

Philosophy academics
Living people
Academics of University College London
Women philosophers
Date of birth missing (living people)
Political philosophers
European University Institute alumni
University of California, Berkeley faculty
Hume scholars
Rousseau scholars
Year of birth missing (living people)